Locally known as Airport Boulevard, State Road 750 (SR 750) is a  spur from Ninth Avenue in Pensacola to the entrance of Pensacola International Airport.  The western terminus is an intersection with Pensacola Boulevard (U.S. Route 29 or US 29 and SR 95).

Since the state of Florida renumbered its Florida State Roads in 1945, a grid system of designation was imposed.

Major intersections

References

External links

Florida 750 (AARoads)

750
750